Senator Meredith may refer to:

Elisha E. Meredith (1848–1900), Virginia State Senate
John A. Meredith (1814–1882), Virginia State Senate
Wesley Meredith (born 1963), North Carolina State Senate